Kush Maini (born 22 September 2000) is an Indian racing driver currently competing in the 2023 Formula 2  Championship for Campos Racing. He has previously competed in Formula 4, the Formula Renault Eurocup, the FIA World Endurance Championship,
the BRDC British Formula 3 Championship, and most recently FIA Formula 3.

He is the younger brother of Arjun Maini, also a racing driver who competed in GP3 and Formula 2, and the nephew of Indian business magnate Chetan Maini.

Career

Lower formulae

2016 
Maini started his single-seater career in 2016, competing for BVM Racing in the Italian F4 Championship. His campaign started in a strong fashion, scoring points in the first six races of the year. After a difficult middle part of the year, the Indian scored his first podium in car racing, taking third place at the final race in Vallelunga. He finished the season 16th in the standings and ended up fifth in the rookies' championship.

2017 
For 2017 Maini moved to Jenzer Motorsport, once again racing in Italian F4, partnering Giorgio Carrara, Federico Malvestiti, Giacomo Bianchi and Job van Uitert. Maini's sophomore year would prove to be more successful, with two podiums at Imola and Monza, as well as a slew of top five finishes helping him finish eighth in the end results.

Progression in single-seaters

2018 
In 2018 the Indian driver stepped up to the British Formula 3 Championship with Lanan Racing. The season ended up being a breakthrough year, winning the reversed-grid race at Rockingham and scoring seven further podiums, which meant that Maini would end up third in the standings.

2019 
The following year, Maini switched to the Formula Renault Eurocup with M2 Competition. He hit the ground running with a podium in his first race at Monza, but was unable to replicate such result again throughout the season. He was a consistent points scorer though, and came sixth in the standings with 102 points, as the second highest placed rookie.

2020 
Initially intending to remain in the Eurocup in 2020 with 3-time champions R-ace GP, the Indian changed his plans following the COVID-19 pandemic and returned to the British F3 series, teaming up with Hitech Grand Prix. Maini finished second in the standings, having won three races throughout the year.

2021 
Maini began 2021 competing for new Indian outfit Mumbai Falcons in the F3 Asian Championship during the winter, partnering Formula 2 driver Jehan Daruvala. He endured a tough start to the season, but a run of seven points finishes in the last nine races, including a podium at the last round in Abu Dhabi, moved him up to 11th place in the standings.

He was unable to find a full-time drive for the main season, his sole other race of the year coming at the 6 Hours of Bahrain of the 2021 FIA World Endurance Championship, as a one-off replacement in ARC Bratislava's LMP2 squad.

FIA Formula 3 Championship 
Maini progressed to the FIA Formula 3 Championship in 2022, driving alongside Caio Collet and Alexander Smolyar at MP Motorsport. Maini was quoted as saying that he was "excited to join MP Motorsport for [his] first year in FIA F3", and that the team's results the previous year showed "their ability to coach rookie drivers on their way to immediately performing well in the series". He started his season off by qualifying in third place in Bahrain, however Maini would be forced to start from the back of the grid for both races due to him missing the weighbridge during the session. At the next round in Imola, Maini scored his first points of the season with a fifth-placed finish. More points followed at Silverstone, where Maini lost out on the podium to Reece Ushijima in the sprint race. Maini would experience his best result of the season in Hungary, finishing third on Saturday, thus scoring his only podium of the year, and seventh on Sunday. However, this would end up being his final points finish of the year, as Maini ended up 14th in the drivers' standings.

FIA Formula 2 Championship 
In November 2022, Maini was confirmed to drive for Campos Racing in the 2023 F2 season, also taking part in the 2022 Formula 2 post-season test at the Yas Marina Circuit.

Racing record

Racing career summary 

* Season still in progress.
† As Maini was a guest driver, he was ineligible to score points.

Complete Italian F4 Championship results 
(key) (Races in bold indicate pole position) (Races in italics indicate fastest lap)

Complete BRDC British Formula 3 Championship results
(key) (Races in bold indicate pole position) (Races in italics indicate fastest lap)

Complete Formula Renault Eurocup results
(key) (Races in bold indicate pole position) (Races in italics indicate fastest lap)

Complete F3 Asian Championship results
(key) (Races in bold indicate pole position) (Races in italics indicate the fastest lap of top ten finishers)

Complete FIA World Endurance Championship results
(key) (Races in bold indicate pole position) (Races in italics indicate fastest lap)

Complete FIA Formula 3 Championship results 
(key) (Races in bold indicate pole position; races in italics indicate points for the fastest lap of top ten finishers)

Complete FIA Formula 2 Championship results 
(key) (Races in bold indicate pole position) (Races in italics indicate points for the fastest lap of top ten finishers)

* Season still in progress.

References

External links 
 
 

Living people
2000 births
Indian racing drivers
BRDC British Formula 3 Championship drivers
Formula Renault Eurocup drivers
F3 Asian Championship drivers
Sportspeople from Bangalore
Italian F4 Championship drivers
ADAC Formula 4 drivers
FIA World Endurance Championship drivers
FIA Formula 3 Championship drivers
BVM Racing drivers
Jenzer Motorsport drivers
M2 Competition drivers
Hitech Grand Prix drivers
MP Motorsport drivers
Karting World Championship drivers
Prema Powerteam drivers
FIA Formula 2 Championship drivers
Campos Racing drivers
Mumbai Falcons drivers